Jonah Bobo (born ) is an American actor and musician. He is best known for his roles as Danny Budwing in the 2005 film Zathura: A Space Adventure, Robbie Weaver in the 2011 film Crazy, Stupid, Love, and the voice of Austin on the Nick Jr.  series The Backyardigans.

Early life
Bobo is from Roosevelt Island, New York and was raised in an Orthodox Jewish household. His father works in software, while his mother is a physical therapist and personal trainer. Bobo's paternal great-grandmother was businesswoman and philanthropist Salha "Mama" Bobo.

Career
His first film role was in The Best Thief in the World. He co-starred in Around the Bend, portraying the youngest of a four-generation family. Bobo was subsequently cast in Zathura: A Space Adventure as Danny Budwing.

Bobo's next role was in Strangers with Candy. He portrayed young Victor Mancini in Choke. He has also made an appearance on 30 Rock as a paparazzo named Ethan. He appeared on Roosevelt Island in the play Seussical, Jr. at the Main Street Theatre and Dance Alliance. He was also on the 5th episode of Royal Pains. From 2005 to 2013, Bobo voiced Austin on Nickelodeon's The Backyardigans. In 2011, he appeared in Crazy, Stupid, Love as Robbie.

Bobo is also a musician, composer and theatre artist, with his theatrical work being awarded distinctions by the Richard Rodgers Award Foundation and the Eugene O'Neill Theater Center. In September 2021, Bobo released his debut album Newgrass Suite.

Filmography

Awards and nominations

References

External links
 
 
 Interview with Jonah Bobo at the LA Premiere of "Zathura" 

1990s births
Living people
American male voice actors
American male child actors
American male film actors
American male television actors
People from Roosevelt Island
21st-century American male actors
Jewish American male actors
Male actors from New York (state)
American people of Egyptian-Jewish descent
American people of Syrian-Jewish descent
Comedians from New York (state)
21st-century American comedians
21st-century American Jews